Reef heron could refer to:
 Western reef heron (Egretta gularis) 
 Pacific reef heron (Egretta sacra)